No Surrender Motorcycle Club is an international outlaw motorcycle club established in the Netherlands. No Surrender was founded in 2013 by Klaas Otto. By 2014, the club claimed over 600 members, and membership exceeded 1600 in 2022. The leaders are mainly Dutch trailer residents or of Turkish,Kurdish origin.

On 16 February 2016, Otto announced he had left the club.

In 2014, three members of the group were reported to have traveled to Iraq to fight alongside Kurdish forces against the Islamic State of Iraq and Syria in Iraq and Syria, an act which is not in itself a crime, according to authorities in the Netherlands.

In June 2015, it was announced that one of the volunteers, Nomad Ron, had died in a traffic accident.

On January 13, 2017, the clubhouse in Emmen was raided by police. According to the authorities, the clubhouse was trading in hard and soft drugs.

On April 22, 2022, the Supreme Court of the Netherlands reaffirmed previous 2019 and 2020 bans on No Surrender in the Netherlands., making it a permanent ban.

On July 26, 2022, in a house in Den Bosch where an explosion occurred. In this house lives Gracia K., who has recently started a relationship with the known criminal and motorcycle club No Surrender Klaas Otto.

References

Outlaw motorcycle clubs
Motorcycle clubs in the Netherlands
2013 establishments in the Netherlands
Gangs in the Netherlands